is a free-to-play collectible card browser video game developed by Nitroplus and DMM Games. The game was launched in Japan in January 2015, and worldwide in April 2021.

The franchise has inspired and been adapted as three anime productions, a two separate productions of a long-running stage play series, a live-action film, and a spin-off game.

Gameplay

Players assume the role of a  who travels into the past to defeat evil forces, and has the ability to animate legendary swords, which are depicted as attractive young men. Touken Ranbu is essentially a gender-swapped clone of Kantai Collection, another game by DMM, which uses moe anthropomorphism to portray historical warships as young girls. Character designs in Touken Ranbu are inspired by the type of sword they portray as well as the period of history they come from. Combat is largely automated, with progress mainly dependent on resource management and grinding. Farming the four types of materials available in the game is required to forge and collect more swords. A number of actions in game are controlled by real time countdowns, such as repairs and forging or collecting new swords.

Touken Ranbu can be played in a web browser or in a phone application. The worldwide version of the game is hosted on the website of Chinese game developer Johren.

Reception
Touken Ranbu quickly became very popular in Japan, particularly with young women, and had over 1.5 million registered players by 2016. The game has been credited with accelerating the Japanese cultural trend of  – women who are interested in, and who pose with, historical Japanese swords. That trend had been started a few years previously with the Sengoku Basara video games, which made katana fans a distinct part of the Japanese subculture of female history aficionados (reki-jo). The popularity of Touken Ranbu was such that a Japanese women's interest magazine published an article about exercise routines based on sword fighting techniques from the game, and the 2015 Tokyo Wonder Festival's figure exhibition was reportedly "completely dominated by hot male swordsmen".

Touken Ranbu has inspired various restoration campaigns for swords represented in the game which were destroyed or damaged in real life. Donors contributed 45 million yen to a crowdfund in order to make a replica of Hotarumaru.

Related media

Anime

The game has received two anime adaptations. The first is Touken Ranbu: Hanamaru (2016) by Doga Kobo and Toho, and the second is Katsugeki/Touken Ranbu (2017) by Ufotable and Aniplex.

In May 2022, it was announced that the series' 2016 stage play Touken Ranbu Kyoden Moyuru Honnōji will be adapted as an anime. Kenichi Suemitsu, the play's director and playwright, will return to handle the scripts.

Stage plays

Touken Ranbu has inspired a series of 2.5D stage plays and musicals since 2016. The stage plays and musicals were both announced simultaneously in 2015 with different companies and cast members behind the two separate productions. Musical: Touken Ranbu, produced with Nelke Planning, first ran on October 30, 2015. Stage: Touken Ranbu, produced by Marvelous and Dentsu, began running on May 3, 2016.

Film

A live-action film adaptation was released on January 18, 2019. The cast from Stage: Touken Ranbu reprised their roles. The film was distributed by Toho and Universal Pictures, directed by Saiji Yakumo, and written by Yasuko Kobayashi.

Spin-off games

In August 2021, Koei Tecmo announced they were developing Touken Ranbu Warriors, a hack and slash game based on their Warriors franchise. The game is developed by Omega Force and Ruby Party, with DMM Games and Nitroplus distributing. The game was released for the Nintendo Switch and Microsoft Windows (through DMM Games) on February 17, 2022, in Japan. It was later released on May 24, 2022, in North America and Europe for the Nintendo Switch and Steam.

References

External links

2015 video games
Browser games
Esports games
Fantasy video games
Free-to-play video games
Japan-exclusive video games
Mass media franchises
Nitroplus
Role-playing video games
Science fantasy video games
Science fiction video games
Video games about time travel
Video games developed in Japan
Video game franchises
DMM Games games